Anisota oslari, or Oslar's oakworm moth, is a moth of the family Saturniidae. It is found from south-western Colorado south through New Mexico and south-eastern Arizona to far western Texas and Mexico.

The wingspan is 50–86 mm. As in most Lepidoptera, the females are larger than males. The upperside of the females is uniform brownish yellow. The forewing with a small white cell spot. The upperside of the males is brownish red, with the hindwing somewhat darker than the forewing. The forewing has a small white cell spot. Adults are day fliers and are on wing from July to August in one generation per year. Adults do not feed.

The larvae feed on various Quercus (oak) species, including Quercus oblongifolia and Quercus turbinella. Young larvae are gregarious, but become solitary as they grow. Fully grown larvae pupate and overwinter in shallow underground chambers.

References

Moths described in 1907
Ceratocampinae
Moths of North America